The Patna Half Marathon has been jointly conceptualized by NCC Dte Bihar & Jharkhand and the Department of Art, Youth & Culture (Bihar Government) to commemorate 75 years of India’s Independence (Azadi Ka Amrit Mahotsav) and 50 years of glorious victory in the Indo-Pak war, 1971 (Swarnim Vijay Varsh). 

By involving the masses in these celebrations, we will foster national pride in India’s achievements and freedom struggle. The event also aims to promote Patna, the beautiful and historical city to the rest of the world, and to support Beti Bachao, Beti Padhao, and Nasha Mukt Samaj Abhiyan.

Prohibition, Excise & Registration Department, Bihar and the Tourism Department - Government of Bihar are the title sponsor for the event.

The event is scheduled for 27th March, 2022.

Course

Event categories 
There are three categories for contestant:
 Victory Run – 21 km
 Freedom Run – 10 km
 Celebration Run – 03 km

Timings 
 Victory Run – 5:00 A.M
 Freedom Run – 5:30 A.M.
 Celebration Run - 6:30 A.M.

Prizes 

Prizes are to be awarded for:

Male and Female categories 21 KM 

 1st Prize 2,00,000
 2nd Prize 1,50,000
 3rd Prize 1,00,000
 4th- 6th Prize 50,000
 7th- 10th Prize 25,000

Male and Female categories 10 KM 

 1st Prize 1,00,000
 2nd Prize 75,000
 3rd Prize 50,000
 4th- 6th Prize 25,000
 7th- 10th Prize 10,000

Organizers 
Patna Half Marathon 2022 is being organized by NCC directorate Bihar & Jharkhand in association with Govt. of Bihar & its various departments.

NCC Uddan is the financial and operations partner for the event whereas Thinkers and Fillers is the digital partner for the same.

References

External links 
 Patna Half Marathon Website
Half marathon

Marathons in India
Recurring sporting events established in 2012
2012 establishments in Bihar
Sport in Patna